Clinical Epidemiology is a peer-reviewed medical journal covering research in epidemiology. It was established in 2009 and is published by the publisher Dove Medical Press.

External links 
 

English-language journals
Open access journals
Dove Medical Press academic journals
Publications established in 2008
Epidemiology journals